Dejan Stevanovič (born 30 November 1976) is a Slovenian slalom canoeist who competed at the international level from 1992 to 2010.

He won a bronze medal in the C1 team event at the 2002 ICF Canoe Slalom World Championships in Bourg St.-Maurice. He also won 2 bronze medals in the same event at the European Championships.

World Cup individual podiums

References

Living people
Slovenian male canoeists
1976 births
Medalists at the ICF Canoe Slalom World Championships